Murtagh (Irish: Muircheartach) is an Irish surname, and may refer to:

St. Murtagh
Andy Murtagh, Irish-born English cricketer, uncle of Chris and Tim
Chris Murtagh, English cricketer, brother of Tim, nephew of Andy
Ciarán Murtagh (born 1990s), Gaelic footballer for Roscommon
Conall Murtagh, footballer
Eugene Murtagh (born 1942), Irish billionaire businessman, founder of Kingspan Group
John Murtagh, New Zealand cricketer
Johnny Murtagh, Irish jockey
Keiran Murtagh, Antigua and Barbuda footballer
Lisa Murtagh, Rose of Tralee winner
Mickey Murtagh, American football player
Tim Murtagh, Irish cricketer, brother of Chris, nephew of Andy 
Valerie Murtagh and Elaine Murtagh of the singing group The Avons
Murtagh, a character in the Inheritance Cycle
Roger Murtaugh, a fictional character in the Lethal Weapon movies.

See also
Murtaugh, Idaho
Murtha

Anglicised Irish-language surnames